Cultural exchange between western peoples, particularly Arabs and Chinese have been occurring for centuries. The earliest records go back to 635 with the discovery of the Nestorian Stone and are then followed by the more famous travels of Marco Polo and Ibn Batutta several centuries later. The records of the latter would influence the perception and invigorate interest in trade and travel with the Chinese.

Earliest Recorded contact
The Nestorian Stone located in Xi'an records the earliest known name of a Christian missionary, Alopen who traveled to China through the Silk Road to Chang'an which was the then capital of the Tang Dynasty in 635. He was sent by the Church of The East. When he arrived in Chang'an he was welcomed by T'ai Tsung where then being enthusiastic about his faith brought him to an imperial library and ordered the books that he brought with him to be translated into Hokkien, and it is noted that of the earliest Christian works earliest works most of them can be dated back to the period of Alopen. In 638, three years after Alopen arrival in China the first Christian church was built in Chang'an and with it came the presence of 21 all Persian Nestorian monks who were recognized to be in the Tang Empire.

The Journeys of Marco Polo
The first tangible record, for what it is worth, of Westerners in Fuzhou is that of Marco Polo, in about 1285 when he visited Fujiu. He observed that the people were the subjects of Kublai Khan, were ‘idolaters’, and much engaged in commerce and manufacture. ‘In these parts, the tigers are of great size and strength. Ginger and galangal are produced in great quantities as well as other drugs.’ He did not seem to be very impressed with Fuzhou and barely gives the city a mention other than to remark that, ‘The people in this part of the country are addicted to eating human flesh, esteeming it more delicate than any other, provided that the person has not been occasioned by disease … They are a most savage race of men, insomuch that when they slay their enemies in battle, they are anxious to drink their blood, and afterwards, they devour their flesh.’

Given that Marco Polo dictated his book in prison several years after he returned from China, the accuracy of his remarks may be suspect. Either his memory was clouded by that time, or his ghostwriter was more imaginative than he was. Some suggest that he did not visit this part of China at all. Nevertheless, he was impressed with Quanzhou(Zaiton), two hundred kilometres to the south of Fuzhou and, according to Marco Polo, fifteen miles from Guangzhou. He claims to have visited Quanzhou, after leaving Fuzhou and making a detour that takes in Guilin and Guangzhou. He found to be Quanzhou a bustling port, was impressed by the quantity of pepper imports, and noted that sugar was produced.

"There is a remarkable passage by Rustichello of Pisa, the "as-told-to" author of The Travels of Marco Polo, that appears to have escaped the attention of Jewish historians altogether. It tells how, when Messer Maffeo, Marco's uncle, and Messer Marco himself were in the city of Fu-Chau, there was in their company a certain Saracen who spoke to them as follows: "In such-and-such a place there is a community whose religion nobody knows. It is evidently not idolatrous, since they keep no idols. They do not worship fire. They do not profess Mahomet. And they do not appear to observe the Christian order. I suggest that we should go and have a talk with them. "Marco Polo and his uncle did just that. At first, writes Rustichello, the members of this mysterious community were reluctant to talk, for they were afraid that their visitors had been sent by the Great Khan to make this investigation in order to get them into trouble. But Maffeo and Marco attended the place regularly day after day, familiarizing themselves with these people and inquiring about their affairs. They discovered that they did indeed hold the Christian faith. For they possessed books, and Maffeo and Marco, poring over them, began to interpret the writing. Translating it word by word from one language to another, till they found that they were the words of the Psalter.

They inquired from what source they had received their faith and their rule; and their informants replied: "From our forefathers." It came out that they had in a certain temple of their three pictures representing three apostles of the seventy who went through the world, preaching. They declared that it was these three who had instructed their ancestors in this faith long ago, and that it had been preserved among them for 700 years. For a long time, they had been without teaching, so that they were "ignorant of the cardinal doctrines." In other words, it seems that their ancestors in China were practicing a form of Judaism but were unaware of the events of the Christian era.

Ibn Battuta
The Rihla documents the world travels of the Moroccan traveler Ibn Battuta, including his journey and travels in China. Ibn Batutta left for China from the Samudra Pasai Sultanate located on the Malaysian island of Sumatra during the month of April 1346 in a junk provisioned for him from the ruler of Samudra Pasai, Al-Mailk al Zahir. In The Rihla Ibn Battuta recalls that the trip to China took just short of four months, possibly owing to stops at two ports in either eastern Malaysia, Champa, or Tonkin though the description and the locations of these places remains a mystery and are thought to have not existed at all.

Historians note that Ibn Battuta's travelogue of his visit in China appear superficial, vague, though it did describe Battutas concern with the dominance of paganism in China and his dislike of most of what he saw in China with him tending to stay at his home as often as he could.  In the Rihla it mentions that he first landed in the port city of Quanzhou and later met with a Chinese envoy who was the chief of customs in the city and who had met with Ibn Battuta in his previous travels and arrived in China before Battuta had, and who possibly allowed for Battuta to later visit the capital of the Yuan Dynasty to meet the emperor as a diplomat of the Sultanate of India. After a while he received word that he was to go on to Beijing to meet with the emperor, and Ibn Battuta is thought to have taken the northward route through the canal system and it is known that he first stopped at a city he called Qanjanfu which is now commonly called Fuzhou and a second stop further up the canal at Hangzhou. He stayed at Hangzhou for a few weeks before returning to Quanzhou where he would eventually leave from the southern coast in the fall monsoon season of 1346.

See also
Christianity in Fujian
Opium Wars
Unequal Treaties

References

History of Imperial China
History of Fujian